Bellafronto Bight is an ice-filled embayment between the base of the west side of Brown Peninsula and the low northwest foot of Mount Discovery, on Scott Coast, Victoria Land. It was named by the Advisory Committee on Antarctic Names (1999) after Lieutenant Robert L. Bellafronto, Civil Engineer Corps, U.S. Navy, a public works officer at McMurdo Station in U.S. Navy Operation Deepfreeze 1977 and 1978.

References 

Bays of Victoria Land
Scott Coast
Bights (geography)